The International Cricket Council Player Rankings is a widely followed system of rankings  for international cricketers based on their recent performances. The current sponsor is MRF Tyres who signed a 4-year deal with the ICC that will last until 2020.

The ratings were developed at the suggestion of Ted Dexter in 1987. The intention was to produce a better indication of players' current standing in the sport than is provided by comparing their averages. Career averages are based on a player's entire career and do not make any allowance for match conditions or the strength of the opposition, whereas the ratings are weighted towards recent form and account for match conditions and the quality of the opponent using statistical algorithms.

Initially the rankings were for Test cricket only, but separate One Day International rankings were introduced in 1998. Both sets of rankings have now been calculated back to the start of those forms of the game. The rankings include the top 10 Test, ODI and T20I batsmen, bowlers and all-rounders based on the rating of each player.

Rankings calculations
The player rankings are a weighted average of all a player's performances, with recent matches weighted most heavily (so the overall effect of a good or bad performance decline over time). Each match performance is given a rating out of 1000, based on a set of pre-determined criteria, and these figures averaged. This means that the maximum possible overall rating is 1000, and a player gaining a rating of 900 is seen as an exceptional achievement. Separate lists are maintained for batting and bowling and an all-rounder rating is also published, which is obtained by multiplying a player's batting and bowling rating together and dividing by 1000.

For batting, the performance rating is based on a combination of runs scored, the rating of the opposition bowlers, match result and comparison to the overall scores in the match.
A bowler gains points based on wickets taken, runs conceded and match result, with more points gained for dismissing highly rated batsmen.
A damping-factor is applied to a player's rating at the start of their career, so they do not get a full rating for their performances until they have played about 20 Tests.

Current rankings

Test rankings

Top 10 Test batsmen

Top 10 Test bowlers

Top 10 Test all-rounders

ODI rankings

Top 10 ODI batsmen

Top 10 ODI bowlers

Top 10 ODI all-rounders

T20I rankings

Top 10 T20I-batsmen

Top 10 T20I bowlers

Top 10 T20I all-rounders

Historical rankings

Historical Test cricket rankings

Year end top ranked players in Test cricket

Batsmen, Bowlers and All-rounders with a peak rating of 900 points or more

Batsmen with a peak rating of 900 points or more

Bowlers with a peak rating of 900 points or more 

All-rounders with a peak rating of 500 points or more

Historical One Day International (ODI) cricket rankings

Year end top ranked players in ODI cricket

Top 10 rankings: batting, bowling and all-rounder

Top 10 Rankings Batting 

Top 10 Rankings Bowling

Top 10 Rankings All-rounder

Historical T20I rankings

Year end top ranked players in T20I cricket

Top 10 T20I rankings: batting, bowling and all-rounder

Top 10 Rankings Batting 

Top 10 Rankings Bowling

Top 10 Rankings All-rounder

See also

ICC Men's Test Team Rankings
ICC Men's ODI Team Rankings
ICC Men's T20I Team Rankings
International cricket
ICC Women's Player Rankings

References

External links
ICC Official site
Current and Historical rankings

Rankings